, also known under the name , is a Japanese voice actress from Yamagata, Japan and is employed by TAB Production.

Filmography

Anime
_summer
BASToF Lemon
Canvas 2 ~Niji Iro no Sketch~
Great Teacher Onizuka
Jigoku Shōjo
Mahoromatic
Monster
Otogi-Jūshi Akazukin
Red Garden
Samurai Shodown
School Days (anime) as Kokoro Katsura
Seven of Seven
Shadow Star
Sgt. Frog
This Ugly Yet Beautiful World

Games
Nadia: The Secret of Blue Water
One: Kagayaku Kisetsu e
Raw Danger

References
Megumi Kobayashi at the Voice Artist DataBase 

1978 births
Japanese voice actresses
Living people